John Smith (?1727-1775), of Combe Hay, near Bath, Somerset, was an English politician.

He was born the eldest son of Robert Smith of Foxcote and Stony Littleton, Somerset and educated at Oriel College, Oxford. He succeeded his father to Combe Hay Manor in 1755 and later extended it.
 
He was a Member (MP) of the Parliament of Great Britain for Bath 19 November 1766 – 12 November 1775.

He married in 1757 the Hon. Anne Tracy, daughter of Thomas Charles Tracy, 5th Viscount Tracy and left one son, John Smith (1759–1813), who changed his name to John Smith Leigh and was High Sheriff of Somerset for 1811.

References

1727 births
1775 deaths
People from Bath, Somerset
Alumni of Oriel College, Oxford
Members of the Parliament of Great Britain for English constituencies
British MPs 1761–1768
British MPs 1768–1774
British MPs 1774–1780